Each entry below presents a list of topics about a specific nation or state (country), followed by a link to the main article for that country. Entries for nations are in bold type, while those for subnational entities are in normal (unbolded) type.

A 
  Index of Abkhazia-related articles
  Index of Akrotiri and Dhekelia-related articles - Sovereign Base Area of Akrotiri (UK overseas territory)
  Index of Åland-related articles - Åland (Autonomous province of Finland)
  Index of Algeria-related articles - People's Democratic Republic of Algeria
  Index of American Samoa-related articles - Territory of American Samoa (US overseas territory)
  Outline of Andorra - Principality of Andorra
  Index of Angola-related articles - Republic of Angola
  Index of Anguilla-related articles - Anguilla (UK overseas territory)
  Index of Antigua and Barbuda-related articles - Antigua and Barbuda
  Index of Argentina-related articles - Argentine Republic
  Index of Armenia-related articles - Republic of Armenia
  Index of Artsakh-related articles - Republic of Artsakh
  Index of Aruba-related articles - Aruba (Self-governing country in the Kingdom of the Netherlands)
  Index of Ascension Island–related articles - Ascension Island (Dependency of the UK overseas territory of Saint Helena)
  Index of Australia-related articles - Commonwealth of Australia
  Index of Austria-related articles - Republic of Austria
  Index of Azerbaijan-related articles - Republic of Azerbaijan

B 
  Outline of the Bahamas - Commonwealth of The Bahamas
  Outline of Bahrain - Kingdom of Bahrain
  List of Bangladesh-related topics - People's Republic of Bangladesh
  Index of Barbados-related articles - Barbados
  List of Belarus-related topics - Republic of Belarus
  Index of Belgium-related articles - Kingdom of Belgium
  List of Belize-related topics - Belize
  Outline of Benin - Republic of Benin
  List of Bermuda-related topics - Bermuda (UK overseas territory)
  Index of Bhutan-related articles - Kingdom of Bhutan
  List of Bolivia-related topics - Republic of Bolivia
  Outline of Bosnia and Herzegovina - Bosnia and Herzegovina
  List of Botswana-related topics - Republic of Botswana
  List of British Virgin Islands-related topics - British Virgin Islands (UK overseas territory)
  List of Brunei-related topics - Negara Brunei Darussalam
  Outline of Bulgaria - Republic of Bulgaria
  Index of Burkina Faso-related articles - Burkina Faso
  Outline of Burundi - Republic of Burundi

C
  Index of Cambodia-related articles - Kingdom of Cambodia
  Index of Cameroon-related articles - Republic of Cameroon
  Index of Canada-related articles - Canada
  Index of Cape Verde–related articles - Republic of Cape Verde
  Index of Cayman Islands-related articles - Cayman Islands (UK overseas territory)
  List of Central African Republic-related topics - Central African Republic
  Outline of Chad - Republic of Chad
  List of Chile-related topics - Republic of Chile
  Index of China-related articles - People's Republic of China
  Index of Christmas Island–related articles - Territory of Christmas Island (Australian overseas territory)
  Index of Cocos (Keeling) Islands-related articles - Territory of Cocos (Keeling) Islands (Australian overseas territory)
  Index of Colombia-related articles - Republic of Colombia
  Index of Comoros-related articles - Union of the Comoros
  Index of Democratic Republic of the Congo-related articles - Democratic Republic of the Congo
  Index of Republic of the Congo–related articles - Republic of the Congo
  Index of Cook Islands–related articles - Cook Islands (Self-governing in free association with New Zealand)
  Index of Costa Rica-related articles - Republic of Costa Rica
  Index of Croatia-related articles - Republic of Croatia
  Index of Cuba-related articles - Republic of Cuba
  Index of Curaçao-related articles - Curaçao
  Index of Cyprus-related articles - Republic of Cyprus
  List of Czech Republic-related topics - Czech Republic

D 
  Index of Denmark-related articles - Kingdom of Denmark
  Index of Akrotiri and Dhekelia-related articles - Sovereign Base Areas of Dhekelia (UK overseas territory)
  Index of Djibouti-related articles - Republic of Djibouti
  Index of Dominica-related articles - Commonwealth of Dominica
  Index of Dominican Republic-related articles - Dominican Republic

E 
  List of East Timor-related topics - Democratic Republic of Timor-Leste
  Index of Ecuador-related articles - Republic of Ecuador
  Index of Egypt-related articles - Arab Republic of Egypt
  Index of El Salvador–related articles - Republic of El Salvador
  Outline of England - England
  Index of Equatorial Guinea–related articles - Republic of Equatorial Guinea
  Index of Eritrea-related articles - State of Eritrea
  Index of Estonia-related articles - Republic of Estonia
  Index of Ethiopia-related articles - Federal Democratic Republic of Ethiopia

F 
  List of Falkland Islands-related topics - Falkland Islands (UK overseas territory)
  Outline of the Faroe Islands - Faroe Islands (Self-governing country in the Kingdom of Denmark)
  Index of Fiji-related articles - Republic of the Fiji Islands
  List of Finland-related topics - Republic of Finland
  Outline of France - French Republic
  Index of French Guiana-related articles - French Guiana (French overseas department)
  Index of French Polynesia-related articles - French Polynesia (French overseas community)

G 
  Index of Gabon-related articles - Gabonese Republic
  Index of Gambia-related articles - Republic of the Gambia
  Index of Georgia (country)-related articles - Georgia
  Index of Germany-related articles - Federal Republic of Germany
  Index of Ghana-related articles - Republic of Ghana
  Outline of Gibraltar - Gibraltar
  Index of Greece-related articles - Hellenic Republic
  Index of Greenland-related articles - Greenland (Self-governing country in the Kingdom of Denmark)
  Index of Grenada-related articles - Grenada
  Index of Guadeloupe-related articles - Guadeloupe (French overseas department)
  Index of Guam-related articles - Territory of Guam (US overseas territory)
  Index of Guatemala-related articles - Republic of Guatemala
  Index of Guernsey-related articles - Bailiwick of Guernsey (British Crown dependency)
  Index of French Guiana-related articles - French Guiana (French overseas department)
  Index of Guinea-related articles - Republic of Guinea
  Index of Guinea-Bissau-related articles - Republic of Guinea-Bissau
  Index of Guyana-related articles - Co-operative Republic of Guyana

H 
  Index of Haiti-related articles - Republic of Haiti
  List of Honduras-related topics - Republic of Honduras
  Index of Hong Kong-related articles - Hong Kong Special Administrative Region of the People's Republic of China (a highly autonomous territory)
  Index of Hungary-related articles - Republic of Hungary

I 
  Index of Iceland-related articles - Republic of Iceland
  List of Indonesia-related topics - Republic of Indonesia
  List of Iran-related topics - Islamic Republic of Iran
  List of Ireland-related topics - Ireland
 See Index of Falkland Islands-related articles for Islas Malvinas
  Outline of the Isle of Man - Isle of Man (British Crown dependency)
  Index of Israel-related articles - State of Israel
  Index of Italy-related articles - Italian Republic
  Index of Ivory Coast–related articles - Republic of Ivory Coast

J 
  Index of Jamaica-related articles - Jamaica
  Index of Japan-related articles - Japan
  Outline of Jersey - Bailiwick of Jersey (British Crown dependency)
  Index of Jordan-related articles - Hashemite Kingdom of Jordan

K 
  Index of Kazakhstan-related articles - Republic of Kazakhstan
  Index of Kenya-related articles - Republic of Kenya
  Outline of Kiribati - Republic of Kiribati
  Outline of North Korea - Democratic People's Republic of Korea
  Outline of South Korea - Republic of Korea
  Outline of Kosovo - Republic of Kosovo
  Index of Kuwait-related articles - State of Kuwait
  Index of Kyrgyzstan-related articles - Kyrgyz Republic

L 
  List of Laos-related topics - Lao People's Democratic Republic
  Outline of Latvia - Republic of Latvia
  Index of Lebanon-related articles - Lebanese Republic
  Index of Lesotho-related articles - Kingdom of Lesotho
  Index of Liberia-related articles - Republic of Liberia
  Index of Libya-related articles - Great Socialist People's Libyan Arab Jamahiriya
  Outline of Liechtenstein - Principality of Liechtenstein
  Outline of Lithuania - Republic of Lithuania
  Outline of Luxembourg - Grand Duchy of Luxembourg

M 

  Index of Macau-related articles - Macao Special Administrative Region of the People's Republic of China (Area of special sovereignty)
  Index of Madagascar-related articles - Republic of Madagascar
  List of Malaysia-related topics - Malaysia
  List of Maldives-related topics - Republic of Maldives
  Index of Mali-related articles - Republic of Mali
  Index of Malta-related articles - Republic of Malta
  Index of Marshall Islands-related articles - Republic of the Marshall Islands
  Index of Martinique-related articles - Martinique (French overseas department)
  Index of Mauritania-related articles - Islamic Republic of Mauritania
  List of Mauritius-related topics - Republic of Mauritius
  List of Mayotte-related topics - Mayotte (French overseas community)
  Index of Mexico-related articles - United Mexican States
  Index of Federated States of Micronesia-related articles - Federated States of Micronesia
  Outline of Moldova - Republic of Moldova
  Outline of Monaco - Principality of Monaco
  Index of Mongolia-related articles - Mongolia
  Outline of Montenegro - Republic of Montenegro
  Index of Montserrat-related articles - Montserrat (UK overseas territory)
  Outline of Morocco - Kingdom of Morocco
  Index of Mozambique-related articles - Republic of Mozambique

N 
  Index of Artsakh-related articles - Republic of Artsakh
  Index of Namibia-related articles - Republic of Namibia
  Index of Nauru-related articles - Republic of Nauru
  Outline of Nepal - Kingdom of Nepal
  Outline of the Netherlands - Kingdom of the Netherlands
  Index of Netherlands Antilles-related articles - Netherlands Antilles (Self-governing country in the Kingdom of the Netherlands)
  Outline of New Caledonia - Territory of New Caledonia and Dependencies (French community sui generis)
  Outline of New Zealand - New Zealand
  Index of Nicaragua-related articles - Republic of Nicaragua
  Outline of Niger - Republic of Niger
  Index of Nigeria-related articles - Federal Republic of Nigeria
  Outline of Niue - Niue (Self-governing in free association with New Zealand)
  Outline of North Korea - Democratic People's Republic of Korea
  Outline of North Macedonia - Republic of North Macedonia
  Outline of Norfolk Island - Territory of Norfolk Island (Australian overseas territory)
  Outline of Northern Cyprus - Turkish Republic of Northern Cyprus
  List of Northern Ireland-related topics - Northern Ireland
  Index of Northern Mariana Islands-related articles - Commonwealth of the Northern Mariana Islands (US overseas commonwealth)
  Outline of Norway - Kingdom of Norway

O 
  Index of Oman-related articles - Sultanate of Oman

P 
  Index of Palau-related articles - Republic of Palau
  Index of Panama-related articles - Republic of Panama
  Outline of Papua New Guinea - Independent State of Papua New Guinea
  Index of Paraguay-related articles - Republic of Paraguay
  Index of Peru-related articles - Republic of Peru
  List of Philippines-related topics - Republic of the Philippines
  Outline of the Pitcairn Islands - Pitcairn, Henderson, Ducie, and Oeno Islands (UK overseas territory)
  Outline of Poland - Republic of Poland
  Index of Portugal-related articles - Portuguese Republic
  Outline of Transnistria - Pridnestrovian Moldavian Republic
  Index of Puerto Rico-related articles - Commonwealth of Puerto Rico (US overseas commonwealth)

Q 
  List of Qatar-related topics - State of Qatar

R 
  Outline of Romania - Romania
  Outline of Russia - Russian Federation
  Outline of Rwanda - Republic of Rwanda

S 
  Outline of the Sahrawi Arab Democratic Republic - Sahrawi Arab Democratic Republic
  Index of Saint Barthélemy-related articles - Saint Barthélemy (French overseas collectivity)
  Outline of Saint Helena - Saint Helena (UK overseas territory)
  Index of Saint Kitts and Nevis-related articles - Federation of Saint Christopher and Nevis
  Index of Saint Lucia-related articles - Saint Lucia
  Index of the Collectivity of Saint Martin-related articles - Saint Martin (French overseas collectivity)
  Index of Saint Pierre and Miquelon-related articles - Saint Pierre and Miquelon (French overseas collectivity)
  Index of Saint Vincent and the Grenadines-related articles - Saint Vincent and the Grenadines
  Outline of Samoa - Independent State of Samoa
  Index of San Marino–related articles - Most Serene Republic of San Marino
  List of São Tomé and Príncipe-related topics - Democratic Republic of São Tomé and Príncipe
  Index of Saudi Arabia-related articles - Kingdom of Saudi Arabia
  Outline of Scotland - Scotland
  Index of Senegal-related articles - Republic of Senegal
  Outline of Serbia - Republic of Serbia
  Outline of Seychelles - Republic of Seychelles
  Index of Singapore-related articles - Republic of Singapore
  Outline of Slovakia - Slovak Republic
  Outline of Slovenia - Republic of Slovenia
  Outline of the Solomon Islands - Solomon Islands
  Index of Somalia-related articles - Somalia
  Outline of Somaliland - Republic of Somaliland
  List of South Africa-related topics - Republic of South Africa
  Index of South Georgia and the South Sandwich Islands-related articles - South Georgia and the South Sandwich Islands (UK overseas territory)
  Outline of South Korea - Republic of Korea
  Index of Soviet Union-related articles - Union of Soviet Socialist Republics (USSR)
  Outline of Spain - Kingdom of Spain
  Outline of Sri Lanka - Democratic Socialist Republic of Sri Lanka
  Outline of Sudan - Republic of the Sudan
  Outline of Svalbard - Svalbard (Territory of Norway)
  List of Sweden-related topics - Kingdom of Sweden
  Index of Switzerland-related articles - Swiss Confederation
  Index of Syria-related articles - Syrian Arab Republic

T 
  Index of Taiwan-related articles - Republic of China
  List of East Timor-related topics - Democratic Republic of Timor-Leste
  Outline of Tokelau - Tokelau (Overseas territory of New Zealand)
  Outline of Tonga - Kingdom of Tonga
  Outline of Transnistria - Pridnestrovian Moldavian Republic
  List of Trinidad and Tobago-related topics - Republic of Trinidad and Tobago
  Outline of Tristan da Cunha - Tristan da Cunha (Dependency of the UK overseas territory of Saint Helena)
  Outline of Tunisia - Tunisian Republic
  Index of Turkey-related articles - Republic of Turkey
  Index of Turkmenistan-related articles -Turkmenistan
  Index of Turks and Caicos Islands-related articles - Turks and Caicos Islands (UK overseas territory)
  Outline of Tuvalu - Tuvalu

U 
  Index of Uganda-related articles - Republic of Uganda
  Outline of Ukraine - Ukraine
  List of United Arab Emirates-related topics - United Arab Emirates
  Outline of the United Kingdom - United Kingdom of Great Britain and Northern Ireland
  Index of United States-related articles - United States of America
  Index of Uruguay-related articles - Eastern Republic of Uruguay

V 
  Index of Vatican City-related articles - State of the Vatican City
  Index of Venezuela-related articles - Bolivarian Republic of Venezuela
  Index of Vietnam-related articles - Socialist Republic of Vietnam
  List of British Virgin Islands-related topics - British Virgin Islands (UK overseas territory)
  Index of United States Virgin Islands-related articles - United States Virgin Islands (US overseas territory)

W 
  Outline of Wales - Wales
  Outline of Wallis and Futuna - Territory of Wallis and Futuna Islands (French overseas community)

Y 
  List of Yemen-related topics - Republic of Yemen

Z 
  Outline of Zambia - Republic of Zambia
  Index of Zimbabwe-related articles - Republic of Zimbabwe

See also
 List of sovereign states